Enicospilus is a genus of large Ichneumonidae wasps. They are unusual for wasps in that they fly at night and can be found near porch lights. While these wasps resemble crane flies with long legs and long, thin bodies, the presence of two sets of wings distinguishes them from the single pair of wings of Diptera (true flies including crane flies). There are almost 700 described species of Enicospilus.

References 

Ichneumonidae